Covenant Christian High School can refer to:
Covenant Christian High School (Indianapolis, Indiana)
Covenant Christian High School (DeMotte, Indiana)
Covenant Christian High School (Michigan)